Tony 'Shrimp' Davey (born 15 August 1951) is a former speedway rider from England.

Speedway career 
Davey rode in the top tier of British Speedway from 1970-1980, riding for Ipswich Witches for the entire ten year period. He reached the final of the British Speedway Championship on three occasions in 1973, 1975 and 1978.

References 

1951 births
Living people
British speedway riders
Ipswich Witches riders